Rohingya persecution in Myanmar refers to a recurring pattern of persecution of the Rohingya people, a largely Muslim group in Myanmar.

Examples include:
Rohingya conflict, a series of ongoing violent clashes in northern Rakhine State, Myanmar
Arakan massacres in 1942, commonly regarded as the event that started the conflict.
2015 Rohingya refugee crisis, a mass migration of Rohingya people from Myanmar and Bangladesh, due in part to the conflict.
2016 Rohingya persecution in Myanmar
2017 Rohingya persecution in Myanmar, which included:
Gu Dar Pyin massacre, Massacre of Rohingya people by the Myanmar Army on 27 August 2017
Inn Din massacre, Massacre of Rohingya people by the Myanmar Army on 30 August 2017
Tula Toli massacre, Massacre of Rohingya people by the Myanmar Army on 2 September 2017

See also
 Persecution of Muslims in Myanmar

Rohingya conflict